Väike-Palkna Lake is a boundary lake between Estonia (Haanja Parish, Võru County) and Latvia.

See also
 List of lakes of Estonia

References

Rõuge Parish
Lakes of Võru County
Lakes of Latvia